Afton Center is an unincorporated community in DeKalb County, Illinois, United States, located  south of DeKalb.

References

Unincorporated communities in DeKalb County, Illinois
Unincorporated communities in Illinois